Abdulrahman Mohsen (Arabic: عبد الرحمن محسن; born 22 July 1991) is a Qatari footballer.

References

Qatari footballers
1991 births
Living people
Al-Khor SC players
Al-Shahania SC players
Qatar Stars League players
Association football defenders